The Isclero is a stream in Campania, southern Italy. Its sources is formed by confluence of the Varco, Cola and Querci torrents; it then flows in the Valle Caudina, where it receives the waters of the Tesa and Faenza, and then continues running in the Moiano ravine and, subsequently, in the territory of Sant'Agata de' Goti.

The Isclero flows into the Volturno near Limatola.

See also
Caudine Forks, located near the Isclero's sources

References 
Rivers of the Province of Avellino
Rivers of the Province of Benevento
Rivers of Italy